Dorothee Parker (born 1938) is a former German stage and film actress. She was married to the film producer Wolf C. Hartwig, and appeared in a number of his films. After their separation she established a modelling agency in Hamburg.

Biography 
Parker was born in Cologne, Germany. She began to play under the slightly changed name Dorothee Glöcklen and in 1959 began her first permanent engagements at the Westphalian State Theater in Castrop-Rauxel and in Recklinghausen (Ruhr Festival). In the same year, the film producer Wolf C. Hartwig discovered the black-haired woman and used her as an attractive eye-catcher in the majority of the films he produced over the next five years.

Selected filmography

 Final Destination: Red Lantern (1960)
 Horrors of Spider Island (1960)
 Satan Tempts with Love (1960)
 Island of the Amazons (1960)
 Melody of Hate (1962)
 Between Shanghai and St. Pauli (1962)
 The Hot Port of Hong Kong (1962)
 The Black Panther of Ratana (1963)
 Mystery of the Red Jungle (1964)
 Mission to Hell (1964)
 Massacre at Marble City (1964)
 The Pirates of the Mississippi (1964)

References

Bibliography 
 Warren, Bill. Keep Watching the Skies!: American Science Fiction Movies of the Fifties. McFarland, 2009.
 Weisser, Thomas. Spaghetti Westerns: The Good, the Bad, and the Violent : a Comprehensive, Illustrated Filmography of 558 Eurowesterns and Their Personnel, 1961-1977. McFarland, 1992.

External links 
 

1938 births
Living people
German film actresses
Actors from Cologne